Red meat is meat that is red when raw and not white when cooked.

Red Meat may also refer to:
 Red Meat (comic strip), a comic strip by Max Cannon
 Red Meat (band), a country band
 "Red Meat" (Supernatural), an episode of Supernatural
 Red Meat (film), a 1997 film by Allison Burnett

See also
 Red Red Meat, a 1990s alternative rock band